Basil the Great Mouse Detective is a platform, action-adventure game designed by Bob Armour and published by Gremlin Graphics in 1987 for the Amstrad CPC, Atari 8-bit and Commodore 64 home computers. The game is based on the 1986 Disney animated movie The Great Mouse Detective.

Plot
The protagonist of the game is a mouse named Basil who resides in the basement of the fabled 221b Baker Street home of Sherlock Holmes. The evil Professor Ratigan has abducted Basil's friend Dr. Dawson, and he now has to scour London for hints that will help him find the villain's hideout.

Gameplay

The player controls Basil by walking around the chambers, passing from one to another through the edges of the screen (if possible) or squeezing through letter slots and other holes in the walls. In the locations, in addition to numerous enemies, there are various objects. Most of them are just decorations, but in each level there are at least two types of containers in which Basil can find items. So when the player spots a container, bin, jar or something similar they should search it. Once the player has collected all the evidence in a level, they need to find the passage to the next stage, which was previously masked. The above steps must be repeated until the game is completed, and there are a total of 3 levels: London's shops and docks, the sewers and finally the hideout of the evil Ratigan.

Reception
John S. Davison for Page 6 said "Overall, the game looks good, sounds good, plays well, and has just the right balance of intellectual challenge to keep players of all ages coming back for more."

What? said "A lovely game with lots of atmosphere and excitement."

Adam Rigby for The Australian Commodore and Amiga Review said "Basil the Great Mouse Detective is a good game with a rather refreshing plot."

Crash said "The characters are very Walt Disneyesque, though the wiry graphics aren't as attractive as they could have been."

Zzap! said "Check this out if you like arcade adventures, but don't expect anything especially innovative."

Sinclair User said "The game play is strong, and the graphics are rather smart."

Reviews
Game Mag (French)
Pelit (Finnish)
Micro Mania (Spanish)
Micro Hobby (Spanish)
Your Sinclair - Jan, 1988
Tilt - Feb, 1988
ASM (Aktueller Software Markt) - Dec, 1987

References

1987 video games
Action-adventure games
Amstrad CPC games
Atari 8-bit family games
Commodore 64 games
Detective video games
Disney video games
Gremlin Interactive games
Platform games
Video games about mice and rats
Video games based on films
Video games developed in the United Kingdom
Video games scored by Ben Daglish
Video games set in London
Video games set in the 19th century
ZX Spectrum games